Nicolas H. Hoydonckx (29 December 1900 – 4 February 1985) was a Belgian football (soccer) player in defender role.

In career he played for clubs Berchem, Royal Excelsior Hasselt and Tilleur. For Belgium national football team he got 36 international caps from 1928 to 1933, and participated at the 1928 Summer Olympics and the 1930 FIFA World Cup.

References

1900 births
Belgian footballers
Belgium international footballers
Association football defenders
Olympic footballers of Belgium
Footballers at the 1928 Summer Olympics
1930 FIFA World Cup players
1985 deaths
K. Berchem Sport players
R.F.C. Tilleur players